Infierno en el Ring is the name of an annual professional wrestling super show or pay-per-view (PPV) event held by the Mexican professional wrestling promotion Consejo Mundial de Lucha Libre (CMLL) since 2008. The term Infierno en el Ring is also the "brand name" used by CMLL for a multi-man steel cage match where the last man in the cage is either forced to unmask or have his hair shaved off. Before 2008 the Infierno en el Ring match was the main event of other shows such as the Entre Torre Infernal show in 2000 and the CMLL 74th Anniversary Show in 2007. 19 matches have taken place so far with the most recent being the 2016 Infierno en el Ring, which took place on December 25, 2016.

Match type
The Infierno en el Ring match is a steel cage match where all the competitors are locked in the cage during the match. After a certain time interval, between three and eight minutes traditionally, the wrestlers are allowed to escape the cage by climbing over the top and to the floor. The last two wrestlers remaining in the cage then wrestled against each other under Lucha de Apuestas (bet match) rules inside the steel cage. Whoever loses the match is forced to either unmask or have their hair shaved off per Lucha Libre traditions.

History
The very first Infierno en el Ring was actually promoted as Torre Infernal, Spanish for "Infernal Tower" and was the main event of CMLL's Entre Torre Infernal ("In the Infernal Tower") pay-per-view (PPV) and featured four wrestlers who all put their hair on the line in the match. Máscara Año 2000 lost when Perro Aguayo pinned him. Subsequently, CMLL began promoting all multi-man Steel cage matches that had Lucha de Apuesta (bet match) rules as Infierno en el Ring. CMLL would use the Infierno en el Ring concept the following year as the main event of the CMLL 69th Anniversary Show where 7 wrestlers risked either their hair or their mask on the outcome of the match. In addition the winning side would earn the rights to the name Los Infernales as well. So far the match at the 69th Anniversary Show is the only match to feature a mixture of hair or masks being bet as well as an additional stipulation. In the end El Satánico pinned Máscara Mágica, forcing him to unmask as well as earning his team the rights to be known as Los Infernales.

The next Infierno en el Ring match took place three years after the Anniversary event, on July 18, 2004 and featured six unmasked, main event level wrestlers risking their hair. The finals came down to Perro Aguayo Jr. and his mentor Negro Casas and saw Aguayo Jr. betray Casas, leaving his mentor to have his hair shaved off after the match. This turn was the catalyst to Perro Aguayo Jr. forming the Perros del Mal stable. CMLL repeated the event the following year on June 17 as the main event of a CMLL Super Viernes show. The match featured 9 men in total as the storyline between Los Perros del Mal and other CMLL rudos (bad guys) heated up, with CMLL's top fan favorite Místico added to the match. In the end Damián 666 escaped the cage, leaving Máscara Magica to lose his second Infierno en el Ring match and had his hair shaved off.

The 2006 Infierno en el Ring match was the first to carry the stipulation that the last two wrestlers would have to wrestle in a regular match instead of escaping the cage. The match took place on July 14, 2006 and featured only masked wrestlers, mainly mid-card level wrestlers all risking their masks in the match. In the end the young Misterioso II defeated the experienced Pantera to unmask him.

The Infierno en el Ring concept was used instead of the traditional big singles match CMLL usually books for their Anniversary shows as they booked an eight-man Infierno en el Ring match as the main event of the CMLL 74th Anniversary Show in 2007. The main event saw all eight men put their masks on the line in the cage, ending with Blue Panther pinning Lizmark Jr. to win the match. The following year CMLL introduced an event called Infierno en el Ring, dedicating an entire event to the cage match. That year's cage match saw 10 wrestlers risk their hair in the match. The finals saw El Texano Jr. defeat Heavy Metal, costing him all his hair.

CMLL used the Infierno en el Ring five times during 2009, the most of any year. They started the year off with a special Mini-Estrella match, featuring 13 masked Mini-Estrellas facing off. The finals came down to Pierrothito and Shockercito with Pierrothito taking the victory. CMLL held another Mini-Estrellas only cage match on March 3, 2009 in Puebla, Puebla where Mascarita Dorada defeated Sombrita in the final two  That was followed by a match that saw Mini-Estrellas and regular sized competitors mixed together for an Infierno en el Ring on August 18, 2009 where Mini-Estrella Pierrothito pinned regular sized competitor Rafaga to become the only man to win two Infierno en el Ring matches. CMLL also held their annual Infierno en el Ring event in 2009, this time a 15-man cage match with everyone putting their hair on the line. The match served as the start of the "Mexico vs. Japan" storyline that ran for the rest of 2009 as New Japan Pro-Wrestling visitor Naito pinned Toscano to take Toscano's hair. The fifth and last Infierno en el Ring match in 2009 took place on October 18, 2009 and featured a mixture of young wrestlers trying to make a name for themselves and experienced mid-card wrestlers with the prime of their careers behind them. The final saw the young rudo (bad guy) Pólvora pin the experienced tecnico (good guy) Tigre Blanco to unmask him.

CMLL held the only Infierno en el Ring in 2010, the Infierno en el Ring supercard on June 18, 2010. The match featured 12 wrestlers who put their mask on the line in the match. Like the October, 2009 match this cage match featured a mixture of young wrestlers looking to climb up the ranks of CMLL and experienced mid-card wrestlers. The match was the first time two tecnicos ended up as the finalists and saw Ángel de Oro pin Fabián el Gitano to unmask him

So far nine of the 19 matches have featured wrestlers putting their mask on the line and seven risking their hair with a couple of the events featuring mixed bets. Two of the 19 matches have featured CMLL's Mini-Estrella division, one has been mixed, two featured all female competitors and the rest have featured CMLL's regular male division. The first match had the fewest participants with just four, while two of the Infierno en el Ring matches featured 15, the most of any event so far. Only two men, Pierrothito and Máscara Magica, have been part of the final two for multiple matches with Pierrothito being the only wrestler to win two Infierno en el Ring Apuesta matches and Máscara Magica being the only wrestler to lose two.

Dates, venues and results

Also known as
CMLL is not the only Mexican wrestling promotion to promote multi-man steel cage matches under Lucha de Apuesta rules. In Asistencia Asesoría y Administración (AAA) such a match is referred to as Domo de la Muete ("Dome of Death") and in International Wrestling Revolution Group (IWRG) they promote an annual Castillo del Terror ("Castle of Terror") with similar rules.

References

CMLL Infierno en el Ring
Annual events in Mexico